12 is the twelfth album by Keller Williams, released in 2007.  It features one song from each of his previous 11 albums, as well as one previously un-recorded song (Freshies).

Track listing
 Turn in Difference 3:24
 Anyhow Anyway  5:24
 Tribe 4:48
 Breathe 4:13
 More Than a Little 7:50
 Freeker by the Speaker 4:54
 Butt Sweat  4:42
 Apparition  4:37
 Keep It Simple 4:35
 Local  4:08
 People Watchin'  5:16
 Freshies 2:43
 The 'Make the Title Look Silly' Track 3:15

Credits
 John Alagía – Engineer, Mixing
 Robert Battaglia – Engineer
 Mark Berger – Package Design
 Ty Burhoe – Tabla
 Kevin Clock – Engineer, Mixing
 Jeff Covert – Guitar, Engineer, Editing, Remixing, Mastering, Mixing, Soloist
 Doug Derryberry – Guitar, Engineer, Mixing
 Craig Dougald – Marimba
 Béla Fleck – Banjo, Engineer
 David Glasser – Mastering
 Louis Gosain – Engineer, Sample Engineering
 Bill Harris – Quintet Artwork
 Scott Harris – Bass
 Stacy Heydon – Engineer, Mixing
 Kyle Hollingsworth – Keyboards
 Scott Hull – Mastering
 Jamie Janover – Dulcimer (Hammer)
 Michael Kang – Violin
 Jenny Keel – Bass
 Larry Keel – Guitar
 Brian Durrett - Bass
 Jack Mascari – Engineer
 Bill Nershi – Slide Guitar
 Tye North – Bass
 Charlie Pilzer – Mastering
 Jim Robeson – Engineer, Mixing, Sample Engineering
 Jeff Sipe – Drums
 Clif Franck - Drums
 Michael Travis – Percussion, Drums
 Keller Williams – Bass, Guitar, Piano (Electric), Voices, Guitar (10 String), Guitar (12 String), Djembe, Shaker, Drum Samples
 Victor Wooten – Bass

References

2007 albums
Keller Williams albums
SCI Fidelity Records albums